Mannsåker is a Norwegian surname. Notable people with the surname include:

Dagfinn Mannsåker (1916–1994), Norwegian archivist and historian
Jon Jørundson Mannsåker (1880–1964), Norwegian priest and politician 

Norwegian-language surnames